Tristam Burges (February 26, 1770October 13, 1853) was a U.S. Representative from Rhode Island, and great-great-uncle of Theodore Francis Green.

Early life and law career
Burges was born in Rochester in the Province of Massachusetts Bay on February 26, 1770, to John and Abigail Burges. Burges' father was a cooper and farmer, and a Revolutionary War veteran.

Burges attended the common schools. He studied medicine at a school in Wrentham. Upon the death of his father he abandoned the study of medicine. He was graduated from Rhode Island College (now Brown University), Providence, Rhode Island, valedictorian of the class of 1796. He studied law, and was admitted to the bar in 1799 and commenced practice in Providence, Rhode Island.

He married in 1801 to a daughter of Hon. Welcome Arnold, and had several children.

Political career
He served as member of the Rhode Island General Assembly in 1811 and a prominent member of the Federalist Party. He was appointed chief justice of the Supreme Court of Rhode Island in May 1815, serving for just one year.

In 1815 Burges was named as professor of oratory and belles letters at Brown University; he taught lectures in rhetoric and oratory. He was dismissed from this position in 1830.

Burges was elected to the US Congress in 1825 as a Federalist and served for ten years. He was known for his witty repartee with Anti-New England Virginian John Randolph. He favored a protective trade tariff, and he lost re-electing because he refused to accept a tariff compromise proposed by Henry Clay.

Burges was elected as an Adams candidate to the Nineteenth and Twentieth Congresses and elected as an Anti-Jacksonian to the Twenty-first through the Twenty-third Congresses (March 4, 1825 – March 3, 1835). He served as chairman of the Committee on Revolutionary Pensions (Nineteenth Congress), Committee on Military Pensions (Nineteenth and Twentieth Congresses), Committee on Revolutionary Claims (Twenty-first Congress), Committee on Invalid Pensions (Twenty-second and Twenty-third Congresses). He was an unsuccessful candidate for reelection.

After an unsuccessful run for Rhode Island Governor as a Whig party candidate in 1836, he resumed the practice of law in East Providence, Rhode Island.

His desk and bookcase currently resides in the Stanley Weiss Collection. It was made in Providence, Rhode Island in the early 1800s. The maker is uncertain, but it was possibly made by James Halyburton.

He died on his estate, "Watchemoket Farm" in 1853 in the town of Seekonk, Massachusetts (in the portion of which that would later be given from Massachusetts to Rhode Island and be incorporated as East Providence, Rhode Island, from a Supreme Court order settling a boundary dispute between the two states). He was interred in North Burial Ground, Providence, Rhode Island.

Sources

External links
 
 Encyclopedia Brunoniana

1770 births
1853 deaths
Members of the United States House of Representatives from Rhode Island
Brown University alumni
Rhode Island National Republicans
Rhode Island Whigs
19th-century American politicians
National Republican Party members of the United States House of Representatives
Brown University faculty
Chief Justices of the Rhode Island Supreme Court
People from Rochester, Massachusetts
Rhode Island Federalists
Rhode Island lawyers
People from East Providence, Rhode Island
People of colonial Rhode Island
Burials at North Burying Ground (Providence)
19th-century American lawyers